John Cambrian Rowland (7 December 1819 – 1890) was a Welsh painter.

Rowland was born in Lledrod, Ceredigion, the son of Thomas Rowlands. It appears that he was the first professional artist to live in Aberystwyth.

The earliest instance of his work that is  available is his outline drawing of John Williams (Shon Sgubor) that he drew in  1839, and was published in Wales, volume 15 (1898), p. 113.  Another portrait of the Rev. John Hughes is held at the National Library of Wales.

John Cambrian Rowland is mainly remembered for his collection of Welsh costume prints - many of these were published in  1848. These have become standard images of 19th century Welsh life. The contents of his paintings  suggest that he settled in north Wales, and one biography suggests that he was appointed  as an art instructor at the Caernarvon Church Training College.

Europeana 280 
In April 2016 the painting was selected as one of Wales' ten iconic paintings as part of the Europeana art project

Bibliography 
Paul Joyner, Artists in Wales c.1740-c.1851, p. 110

References 

1819 births
1890 deaths
People from Ceredigion
19th-century Welsh painters
19th-century Welsh male artists
Welsh portrait painters
Welsh male painters